Rock Creek (California) may refer to the following streams:

Rock Creek (Feather River, Lake Oroville), a tributary of Lake Oroville's North Arm
Rock Creek (Feather River, Middle Fork), a Middle Fork Feather River tributary (via Smithneck Creek) with headwaters on the Sierra Crest (Babbitt Peak)
Rock Creek (Feather River, North Fork), a left North Fork Feather River tributary (via Hamilton Branch) with headwaters west of the Sierra Crest
Rock Creek (Feather River, North Fork), a right North Fork Feather River tributary with headwaters near Spring Valley Mountain
Rock Creek (Feather River, South Fork), a South Fork Feather River tributary.
Rock Creek (Kern River tributary), a North Fork Kern River tributary with headwaters on the Sierra Crest (Mount Langley)
Rock Creek (Owens River tributary), an Owens River tributary with headwaters on the Sierra Crest (Bear Creek Spire)
Rock Creek (Tuolumne River), a Tuolumne River tributary (via Piute Creek) with headwaters on the Sierra Crest
Rock Creek (Yuba River, South Fork), a South Yuba River tributary